Pedro Gonzales
May mean:

A person 
 Pedro Gonzales (Five Joaquins Gang) two men of that name belonging to the Five Joaquins Gang.

In Media 
 Pedro Gonzales, cartoon character in El Nombre.